Sofie Hagen is a London-based Danish comedian, author, podcaster, fashion designer, and fat acceptance campaigner. They have toured with comedy shows, released a book and hosted and co-hosted a number of podcasts.

Biography 
Sofie Hagen was born in Denmark, on 10 November 1988.

Hagen started doing stand-up in Danish in 2010, in Copenhagen. In 2012, Hagen performed on Danish TV show Zulu Comedy Galla.

Hagen moved to London in September 2012 to perform regular comedy. In 2013, Time Out identified Hagen as "One to Watch". Hagen won the Laughing Horse New Act of the Year the same year. In 2014, Hagen won the Chortle Best Newcomer Award for which Hagen was nominated alongside Pierre Novellie, Tim Renkow and Jonny Pelham.

In August 2015, Hagen took the debut hour show, Bubblewrap, to the Edinburgh Fringe Festival. The show was favourably received, with 5-star reviews from ThreeWeeks, The Skinny, and the Daily Mirror. Bubblewrap also received 4 star reviews from Chortle, Time Out, Beyond the Joke, The Herald, The Sunday Times and Fest Magazine. The show won the Fosters sponsored Edinburgh Comedy Awards for Best Newcomer. In November, Virago Press Hagen published an essay in the collection I Call Myself a Feminist.

In July 2016, Hagen appeared in the Channel 4 miniseries Outsiders. Hagen took their second solo show, Shimmer Shatter to the Edinburgh Festival Fringe in August. Hagen attempted to make the next tour welcoming for fans with anxiety issues by allowing them to make contact before shows to let Hagen know their needs. Hagen asked the majority of venues on the tour to provide gender neutral toilets.

The Guardian describes Hagen on stage as having "an easy charm ... and an ability to combine delicate subject matter with big, accessible laughs."

Hagen took the third solo show Dead Baby Frog to the Edinburgh Festival Fringe in August 2017. The show about childhood trauma was described as "urgent, raw and confessional" by The Guardian and "a compelling tale of resistance and breaking free from the shackles of tyranny" by The List.

Hagen espouses the fat acceptance movement. In January 2018, Hagen wrote an article in The Guardian calling for people to stop dieting, labelling it as "boring", "triggering", and "neither feminist – nor healthy". In February 2018, Hagen gained attention for calling for Cancer Research UK to pull their controversial  campaign that, based on cancer research, listed obesity as the second most common cause of cancer. At the time Hagen had no known qualifications in oncology. After directing comments towards the cancer charity on Twitter, Hagen nonetheless described the campaign as "dangerous". Hagen was widely criticized for arguing with a cancer research center despite having no research to back up the extravagant claims, such as "DIETING has been proved TIME AND TIME again to be one of the worst thing you can do to your body".

In 2019, Hagen took the fourth solo show The Bumswing to the Edinburgh Festival Fringe. The List wrote "everything has a purpose in this beautifully created narrative with an apparently deliciously unreliable narrator." about the show, which Hagen described as being " about memory and swings specifically for bums".

In 2019, Hagen had a debut book Happy Fat – Taking Up Space in a World That Wants to Shrink You published by 4th Estate. The book is described as "part memoir, part social commentary, Happy Fat is a funny, angry and impassioned look at how taking up space can be radical, emboldening and life-changing."

Since 2020, Hagen has co-hosted the BBC Sounds true crime podcast Bad People with psychologist and popular science writer Julia Shaw.

Personal life
Hagen says she is (or “identifies as”) bisexual and nonbinary, stating "My pronouns are whatever. She/they/he, whatever you want."

Awards 
2012 – Funny Women Awards – Finalist
 2012 – Leicester Square Theatre New Comedian of the Year 2012 – 3rd place
 2013 – Laughing Horse New Act of the Year – Winner
 2014 – Chortle Awards Best Newcomer – Winner
 2015 – Fosters' Best Newcomer Award – Winner
 2016 – Danish Comedian of the Year – Nominee

Podcasts 
Hagen hosted Comedians Telling Stuff, a podcast series where they ask six questions of six comedians. The show began in August 2013 and ran for nine seasons before ending in 2016. Guests have included Susan Calman, Nick Helm, Richard Herring, Michael Legge, Josie Long, Colin Mochrie, Pappy's, Katherine Ryan, Ian Boldsworth and Arthur Smith, as well as younger comedians and comedians from Denmark.

From December 2015 to December 2016, Hagen co-hosted The Guilty Feminist podcast with Deborah Frances-White.

In 2016, Hagen created the Made of Human comedy podcast, in which they interview various comedians. The New Statesman named Made of Human one of their top 10 podcasts in 2017. The Blurt Foundation named Made of Human one of their top 10 podcasts in 2018. Hannah Parkinson from The Guardian interviewed Hagen about Made of Human when they visited Edinburgh and named it a top podcast from the Edinburgh Fringe Festival. Hagen has interviewed many notable guests including Cameron Esposito, Aisling Bea, Mark Watson, Lolly Adefope, Hari Kondabolu, Nish Kumar, Katherine Ryan, and Sara Pascoe. In 2020, Hagen changed the name of the Made of Human Podcast to Who Hurt You?.

In 2018, Hagen created the Secret Dinosaur Cult podcast with fellow comedian Jodie Mitchell. Their episodes were recorded in front of a live audience in London, at their so-called cult meetings. The podcast ended on April 11, 2020 after 48 episodes, due to COVID.

Beginning in 2020, Hagen began co-hosting a true crime podcast on BBC Radio 4, Bad People with criminal psychologist Julia Shaw.

References

External links 
 
 Sofie Hagen on The Huffington Post

Danish stand-up comedians
Danish women comedians
Danish expatriates in England
Fat acceptance activists
1988 births
Living people
Bisexual comedians
Non-binary comedians
21st-century comedians
Danish LGBT comedians
Danish LGBT writers
Danish bisexual people
Danish non-binary people
Bisexual non-binary people